Grupo Desportivo e Recreativo Textáfrica, usually known simply as Textáfrica, is a traditional football (soccer) club based in Chimoio, central Mozambique.

History
The club was founded in 1928 as Sport Club de Vila Pery. The club won the title of the second stage in 1969, with the title of the Campeonato Colonial de Moçambique. Seven years later Textáfrica do Chimoio won the Mozambican League, in 1976.

Stadium
The club plays their home matches at Campo da Soalpo, which has a maximum capacity of 5,000 people.

Achievements
Moçambola: 1
1976

Campeonato Colonial de Moçambique: 3
 1969, 1971, 1973

Notable coaches 
  Alex Alves (2009)

Notes

Football clubs in Mozambique
Sport in Maputo
Works association football teams